The 2013–14 Melbourne Victory season is the ninth A-League season for the club.

History

The 2013–14 season was Melbourne Victory's ninth season in the A-League. 
On Monday 13 May 2013, Melbourne Victory announced their first signing of the season by signing Brisbane Roar Mitch Nichols on a two-year deal, reuniting him with his former Roar manager Ange Postecoglou. He became Postecoglou's first new signing ahead of the 2013/14 A-League season. On 9 June it was speculated that Melbourne Victory was the prime club looking to sign Greece national team captain, Giorgos Karagounis, after it was confirmed he was to be released by Premier League club Fulham. After it was confirmed the Karagounis talks had come to a halt, Fulham then had second thoughts about the release and decided to pursue Karagounis' signature, which in the end they did. Argentine Marque player Marcos Flores was released with mutual consent on 5 July. Following Flores' departure to Central Coast Mariners, Victory attempted to sign Italian international Fabrizio Miccoli as their marquee player however he signed with Lecce. Following these two disappointments for the Melbourne Victory stakeholders, the victory hosted one of the most notable sporting events in Australian Sporting history. This event was a Melbourne Victory against Liverpool at the MCG in front of 95,446 spectators. The full Liverpool squad was brought to Melbourne, including stars such as Steven Gerrard, Luis Suárez, Kolo Touré, Simon Mignolet, and Brad Jones. Melbourne lost the game 0–2 in what was considered a 'thriller', and has since sparked rumours of the development of a sister club relationship. Following the Liverpool match, Kosta Barbarouses was signed on a 3-year deal. On 17 September, Adrian Leijer handed over the captaincy role to Mark Milligan. On 23 October 2013, it was revealed that Ange Postecoglou will coach the Socceroos and it was rumoured that Kevin Muscat would take over as coach of Melbourne Victory. On 31 October 2013, Muscat was officially appointed as Melbourne Victory's coach.

Players

Senior squad

As of 21 January 2014.

Transfers

Winter

In

Out

Summer

In

Out

Competitions

Overall

Pre-season

A-League

Matches

League table

Results summary

Results by round

League Goalscorers per Round

AFC Champions League

Qualifying play-off

Group stage

Goalscorers

3 goals
  James Troisi
2 goals
  Kosta Barbarouses
  Leigh Broxham
1 goal
  Nick Ansell
  Pablo Contreras
  James Jeggo
  Mark Milligan

Awards
 Player of the Week (Round 25) – Mark Milligan

References

External links
 Official website
 A-League website
 Melbourne Victory Videos

2013-14
2013–14 A-League season by team